Raymond Glastonbury (born 11 December 1938) is a Welsh former rugby union and professional rugby league footballer who played in the 1950s and 1960s.

Background
Ray Glastonbury was born in Bedwellty district, Wales, and he was the younger brother of the rugby union wing who played in the 1950s and 1960s for Cardiff RFC (11-matches during the 1958/59 season), Glamorgan Wanderers RFC and Pontypridd RFC; Blandford Glastonbury (birth registered first ¼  in Pontypridd district, marriage to Patricia K. (née Collins) registered third ¼ 1958 in Cardiff district).

Playing career
Glastonbury was the 1962–63 season's top try scorer with 41-tries. He won a cap for Wales while at Workington Town in 1963.

References

External links
(archived by web.archive.org) Workington and Hull KR triumph in the regions
(archived by web.archive.org) Past Players → G & H at cardiffrfc.com
(archived by web.archive.org) Statistics at cardiffrfc.com
Search for "Raymond Glastonbury" at britishnewspaperarchive.co.uk
Search for "Ray Glastonbury" at britishnewspaperarchive.co.uk

1938 births
Living people
Cardiff RFC players
Rugby league players from Bedwellty
Rugby league wingers
Rugby union players from Bedwellty
Rugby union wings
Wales national rugby league team players
Welsh rugby league players
Welsh rugby union players
Workington Town players